Philip Bruce Goff  (born 22 June 1953) is a New Zealand politician and diplomat. He currently serves as High Commissioner of New Zealand to the United Kingdom since 2023. He was a member of the New Zealand Parliament from 1981 to 1990 and again from 1993 to 2016. He served as leader of the Labour Party and leader of the Opposition between 11 November 2008 and 13 December 2011.

During the Fifth Labour Government, in office from 1999 to 2008, Goff was a senior minister in a number of portfolios, including Minister of Justice, Minister of Foreign Affairs and Trade, Minister of Defence, and Associate Minister of Finance.

Goff was elected mayor of Auckland in 2016, and served two terms, before retiring in 2022.

Early life
Goff was born and raised in Three Kings, Auckland. His family was very poor, and his father wanted Goff to enter the workforce immediately after finishing high school. Goff, however, wished to attend university, a decision that caused him to leave home when only sixteen years old. By working at Westfield Freezing Works and as a cleaner, Goff was able to fund himself through university, gaining an MA (with first class honours) in political studies at the University of Auckland. In 1973, he was Senior Scholar in Political Studies, and also won the Butterworth Prize for law. While completing his MA, he lectured in Political Studies. After his overseas experience in Europe Goff returned to New Zealand where he became an Insurance Workers Union organiser.

Member of Parliament

Goff joined the Labour Party in 1969, the same year he left home, and held a number of administrative positions within the party. He was chairman of the Labour Youth Movement and was twice elected a member of the Labour Party's national council. Goff was also campaign chairman for Eddie Isbey in the  electorate.

In early 1981 Goff put himself forward for the Labour candidacy for the Roskill electorate. He beat 13 contenders (including Malcolm Douglas, Owen Greatbatch, Ken Hastings, Norman Kingsbury, Wayne Mapp and Lois Welch) to win the nomination on 23 April 1981. The next day he resigned his trade union job to be a candidate full-time. In the 1981 elections, Goff was elected Member of Parliament for the Roskill electorate. In 1983 he was appointed as Labour's spokesperson for housing.

Cabinet minister: 1984–1990
Three years later, when Labour won the 1984 elections, Goff was elevated to Cabinet by Prime Minister David Lange, becoming its youngest member. He served as Minister of Housing and (from 1986) Minister for the Environment. As Minister of Housing Goff provided money to finance loans to households in dire financial situations and purchased state rental units. In the disputes during the Fourth Labour Government between Roger Douglas (the reformist Finance Minister) and other Labour MPs, Goff generally positioned himself on the side of Douglas, supporting deregulation and free trade. 

After the 1987 elections, Goff dropped the Housing portfolio, but also became Minister of Employment, Minister of Youth Affairs, Minister of Tourism and Associate Minister of Education (with responsibility for tertiary education). Goff instigated changes to funding of tertiary studies incorporating financial contributions by students rather than the complete government funding that existed at the time. State funding was seen as unsustainable due to large increases in student numbers. The changes included direct fees and streamlined bursaries and student loans. The bursary changes were generally regarded to be fair and were also backed up by a government guarantee to banks willing to fund loans by students. As Minister of Employment Goff oversaw a large increase in unemployment which had risen to 128,000 people by November 1988. There were several protests and marches on Parliament where he faced and spoke to crowds of unemployed people. In response he committed $100 million to reinstate government subsidised training schemes to help the unemployed gain skills for new jobs.

Later, after a significant rearrangement of responsibilities in August 1989 following Lange's resignation, Goff became Minister of Education under new Prime Minister Geoffrey Palmer while relinquishing Employment and Youth Affairs. As Minister of Education he was against any further cuts to tertiary education threatening to resign if there were. He also inherited responsibility for the Tomorrow's Schools reform initiative discovering budgeting errors and a staffing shortage that occurred under his predecessor in the portfolio (Lange). According to cabinet colleague Michael Bassett Goff, despite his best efforts, was never able to regain the initiative in education as a result of this.

In opposition: 1990–1999
In the 1990 elections, Labour was defeated, and Goff lost his parliamentary seat to the National Party's Gilbert Myles. While many commentators blamed Douglas's controversial reforms for Labour's loss, Goff said that the main problem had been in communication, not policy. Goff was appointed to a position at the Auckland Institute of Technology, and later accepted a scholarship to study for six months at Oxford University. Returning to New Zealand, he eventually decided to stand for parliament once again.

In the 1993 elections, Goff was re-elected as MP for Roskill. Helen Clark, Labour's new leader, made him the party's spokesperson for Justice. In 1996, Goff was part of the group which asked Clark to step down as leader. Clark survived the challenge, and was advised by her allies to demote Goff, but chose not to do so.

Goff retained his seat in the 1996 elections, having elected not to be placed on Labour's party list. In Opposition from 1996 to 1999, Goff was Labour's spokesperson on Justice, and Courts & Corrections. After Mike Moore left Parliament to become Director-General of the World Trade Organization Goff also became the party's spokesperson for Foreign Affairs.

Cabinet minister: 1999–2008

In the 1999 elections, which Labour won, Goff accepted seventh place on the party list, but also retained his electorate seat. In the Clark lead Fifth Labour Government, he became Minister of Foreign Affairs and Trade and Minister of Justice. He retained this position after the 2002 elections. Following the 2005 elections Winston Peters was made Minister of Foreign Affairs, and Goff was made Minister of Defence and Disarmament and retained the Trade portfolio.

In 2001 he was centred in the decision to take in 131 refugees from the MV Tampa. The ship had previously been denied entry to Australia by the government of John Howard, dubbed by media as the "Tampa affair". In 2019, Goff stated he thought that New Zealand's decision to take refugees from the Tampa was one of the best decisions made by the Fifth Labour Government. In the aftermath of the September 11 attacks Goff offered New Zealand support to the United States and worked to locate New Zealanders in the area. In 2021 he stated that he felt a personal responsibility when he learned that two New Zealand nationals died in the attack. In October 2001 New Zealand joined the war in Afghanistan against the perpetrators of the attacks. Goff defended the use of air strikes as part of the invasion which the government stressed were targeted at terrorists and were justified under the United Nations Charter stating that they were "regrettably necessary".

In 2003 the Labour government was critical of the American lead Invasion of Iraq which lacked an explicit United Nations mandate, and the New Zealand government withheld military action in the Iraq War. Despite not sending combat troops, the government sent some medical and engineering units to Iraq. In 2003 convicted rapist Stewart Murray Wilson doctored and distributed a letter from Justice Minister Goff, in an apparent attempt to get his case reviewed. In 2005, as justice minister, Goff passed legislation that dramatically strengthened laws condemning child pornography and child sex.

As Foreign Affairs and Trade Minister, Goff favoured free trade deals as a means of diplomacy and strengthening New Zealand's links with Asian neighbours. Goff had a strong public profile and became one of the better-known members of the Labour Party; he was placed number three on the Labour Party list during the 2008 general election. Clark and Goff differed substantially in their economic policies, but they were able to work relatively well together, and this was shown during Goff's signing of the New Zealand–China Free Trade Agreement. The free trade agreement with China took over three years to negotiate with the first round of negotiations being held in December 2004 before the FTA was signed after fifteen negotiation rounds took place. Goff signed the agreement on behalf of the New Zealand government together with the Chinese Minister of Commerce Chen Deming at the Great Hall of the People in Beijing on 7 April 2008. Under the agreement, 37 per cent of Chinese exports to New Zealand and 35 percent of New Zealand exports to China would become tariff free by October 2008, all tariffs for Chinese exports to New Zealand were to be eliminated by 2016, and 96 percent of New Zealand exports to China would be tariff free by 2019.

Leader of the Opposition: 2008–2011

At the 2008 election Labour was defeated, and Clark resigned as leader. Goff was widely tipped as her successor. Goff became leader after a special caucus meeting on 11 November 2008 with former senior minister Annette King was elected as deputy leader.

After initial strong popularity, Goff and Labour began to struggle in public opinion polls. A July 2011 poll showed support for the Labour Party at a 10-year low, at just 27%. This followed a leaked policy proposal for a capital gains tax, which the party's critics suggested was unpopular with the electorate. Polls in 2011 also showed an increase in support for the Green Party.

In an October 2010 speech, Goff emphasised the "Kiwi Dream" of high-wage jobs, home ownership and social protection. He criticised the National Government for free-market economic policies that Goff argued were accentuating inequality; he attributed social inequality to societal problems such as drug abuse and obesity.

Both Goff and Prime Minister John Key said that they would not vote in the 2009 corporal punishment referendum. Goff said that the question "Should a smack as part of good parental correction be a criminal offence in New Zealand?" was "absolutely" the wrong question, and that "the question implies that if you vote 'yes' that you're in favour of criminal sanctions being taken against reasonable parents – actually nobody believes that."

In John Key's Statement to Parliament in February 2010, the government announced its consideration of raising Goods and Services Tax from 12.5% to 15%. Goff opposed the raise, saying that "GST increase will hurt families that are already struggling to make ends meet", and the Labour caucus set out on an 'Axe the Tax' nationwide road trip. In May 2010 Goff suggested exempting fresh fruit and vegetables from GST. Key called the exemption of such items "very bureaucratic" and Goff's announcement "desperate".

In February 2010 a discussion document was released, proposing that 7,058 ha of land in national parks be opened up for mining. Outside Parliament Goff told protesters that he and Labour would oppose the proposals "at every stage", and pledged to re-protect any land released from Schedule 4, should his party return to power.

Parliamentary career after being leader: 2011–2016

On 26 November 2011 the results of the general election were very poor for Labour, which lost 6.86% of the party vote and nine seats. Phil Goff stated that this "wasn't our time this time ... but our time will come again ... we're a bit bloodied but not defeated." Three days after conceding defeat Goff and his deputy, Annette King announced they would be standing down from their leadership positions on 13 December, but would stay on in Parliament as electorate MPs. Goff became the fourth Labour leader, the first since the ousting of Arnold Nordmeyer in 1965, to leave the Labour Party leadership without ever becoming prime minister. Goff was succeeded as leader by David Shearer, who designated him Shadow Minister of Foreign Affairs.

Goff resigned from Parliament on 12 October 2016, necessitating a by-election in his electorate of Mount Roskill.

Mayor of Auckland: 2016–2022

On 22 November 2015 Goff announced he would run for Mayor of Auckland in the 2016 mayoral election. On 8 October 2016 Phil Goff won the election, becoming the second mayor of the Auckland 'super city'.

Goff was formally sworn in as Mayor of Auckland at a ceremonial event at the Auckland Town Hall on 1 November 2016. Upon taking office, he pledged to tackle social issues in Auckland, such as homelessness, so that "no one is left behind"; he also highlighted a need for improved infrastructure and housing availability in order to address the social issues.

Proposed Lauren Southern and Stefan Molyneux speaking event
In early July 2018, Mayor Goff announced that the Auckland Council would not allow the far right Canadian activists Lauren Southern and Stefan Molyneux to use council premises on the grounds that they stirred up ethnic or religious tensions and promoted divisive views. Southern and Molyneux have drawn controversy in the past for their controversial views on feminism, gender, and Muslim immigration. The pair had booked the Bruce Mason Centre in Auckland's North Shore for a talk on 3 August 2018. While the Auckland Peace Action activist group and the Federation of Islamic Associations of New Zealand had objected to Southern and Molyneux's planned talk, Goff's decision was criticised by the promoter David Pellowe and human rights lawyer Craig Tuck for violating free speech. In addition, The Spinoff contributor and self-described agnostic Muslim Ali Shakir defended the Southern and Molyneux tour and disputed the FIANZ's claim to speak for all Muslims on this matter. New Zealand Deputy Prime Minister and Minister of Foreign Affairs Winston Peters and National Party leader Simon Bridges said they would have supported her right to speak, while Green Party co-leader Marama Davidson said she supported the ban.

In response to Goff's decision, a group calling themselves the "Free Speech Coalition" announced that it would be collecting funds for a judicial review of the decision to ban Southern and Molyneux from Council premises. This group consisted of several business leaders, academics, lawyers, and journalists including the former Labour President Michael Bassett, former National and ACT parties leader Don Brash, Property Institute chief executive Ashley Church, Auckland University of Technology historian Paul Moon, left-wing commentator Chris Trotter, and New Zealand Taxpayers' Union Jordan Williams. Within 24 hours, the group had reached its initial fundraising target of NZ$50,000.

On 18 July, Free Speech Coalition spokesperson David Cumin announced that the group had filed legal proceedings against Mayor Goff and the Auckland Council after a failed attempt to broker a deal with Goff and the council to reinstate the speaking event planned by Southern and Molyneux. On 25 July, the Free Speech Coalition withdrew their proceedings against Mayor Goff but warned that further legal action could go ahead. Goff welcomed the development and reiterated his opposition to allowing Council facilities to host events promoting hate speech. The Immigration Minister Iain Lees-Galloway had earlier granted Southern and Molyneux a visa allowing them to visit New Zealand on the grounds that they had not violated any immigration character requirements.

Serious Fraud Office investigation, 2020
In late February 2020, the Serious Fraud Office announced that it was investigating an election expanses declaration of cash donations from fundraising auctions of $366,115 filed by Goff during the 2016 mayoral election.

On 7 April 2022, the Serious Fraud Office closed it investigation into Goff's mayoral fundraising campaigns, stating that the matter has been closed. Goff's mayoral campaign welcomed the Office's decision to close the investigation and stated that the matter was resolved.

Three Waters reforms
In late October 2021, Goff joined several other mayors across New Zealand including Mayor of Christchurch Lianne Dalziel, Mayor of Wellington Andy Foster, Mayor of the Far North District John Carter, and Mayor of Dunedin Aaron Hawkins in opposing the Government's "Three Waters reform programme", which proposes taking away control of water utilities from local councils and placing them under the control of four new entities.

2022 retirement
On 14 February 2022, Goff announced that he would not seek re-election for a third term of Auckland mayoralty in September 2022, saying that he intended to retire after 41 years in politics. He stated that it was time to pass the baton on to a new generation, and endorsed Efeso Collins for mayor.

High commissioner to the United Kingdom: 2023– 
In October 2022, it was announced that Goff would take up the position of high commissioner of New Zealand to the United Kingdom in January 2023.

Personal life
Phil Goff is married to Mary Ellen Goff, whom he met in 1971 and married in 1979. They have three adult children. He lives on an  farmlet in the rural Auckland suburb of Clevedon. Goff's nephew, U.S. Army Captain Matthew Ferrara, was killed in 2007 during the Afghanistan War.

Honours
In the 2017 New Year Honours, Goff was appointed a Companion of the New Zealand Order of Merit (CNZM), for services as a member of parliament.

Notes

References

External links

Profile on Labour Party website

|-

1953 births
Living people
Members of the New Zealand House of Representatives
Members of the Cabinet of New Zealand
New Zealand defence ministers
New Zealand education ministers
New Zealand foreign ministers
Ministers of Housing (New Zealand)
Justice ministers of New Zealand
New Zealand Labour Party MPs
University of Auckland alumni
Leaders of the Opposition (New Zealand)
New Zealand Labour Party leaders
High Commissioners of New Zealand to the United Kingdom
New Zealand MPs for Auckland electorates
Unsuccessful candidates in the 1990 New Zealand general election
Mayors of Auckland
21st-century New Zealand politicians
Companions of the New Zealand Order of Merit
People educated at Papatoetoe High School
Chevening Scholars